State Road 210 (NM 210) is a  state highway in the US state of New Mexico. NM 210's southern terminus is at NM 268 west of Forrest, and the northern terminus is at NM 209 north of Forrest.

Major intersections

See also

References

210
Transportation in Quay County, New Mexico